Beyza Arıcı (born 27 July 1995) is a Turkish volleyball player who plays as a middle blocker for Eczacıbaşı VitrA and the Turkish national team.

Club career
Arıcı started playing volleyball at İzmir Işıkkent, later moved to Vakıfbank in 2008 and played youth teams of Vakıfbank until 2013. As a youngster, she struggled to break into the senior team in her club and loaned to the second division team Seramiksan for the 2013–14 season, and the first division team Sarıyer Belediyesi for the 2014–15 season.

After two seasons in loan, Arıcı signed with Trabzon İdmanocağı in July 2015. With her new club, Arıcı reached the final at the CEV Challenge Cup where İdmanocağı were defeated by CSM București after losing the both legs of the final. Despite the good performance in the Challenge Cup, İdmanocağı underperformed in the domestic competition and only just avoided from relegation by finishing in tenth place in the Turkish League.

In May 2016, Arıcı agreed on a one-year contract with Çanakkale Belediyespor. She had a very successful season with her team in terms of both her individual performance and the performance of the team. Çanakkale Belediyespor finished the regular season in club's highest sixth place while Arıcı was named as the third best middle blocker of the season behind Eda Erdem Dündar and Milena Rašić. In the playoffs, Çanakkale Belediyesi lost to Eczacıbaşı VitrA in the quarter final stage. At the end of the season, Arıcı joined Eczacıbaşı VitrA.

In her first season with Eczacıbaşı, Arıcı helped her team to win the CEV Cup, and reach the Turkish Cup final where Eczacıbaşı lost to Vakıfbank. In the Turkish League, Eczacıbaşı topped the league in the regular season and eliminated Nilüfer Belediyesi and Fenerbahçe en route to the final in the playoffs. In the final series against Vakıfbank, Eczacıbaşı had a 2–1 lead in the series but suffered two consecutive losses despite having a home court advantage in both matches and lost the series 3–2. Arıcı was voted the "best blocker" of the series and she was the only Eczacıbaşı player that was awarded.

International career
Arıcı made her international debut with the Turkish national volleyball team in a World Grand Prix match against Brazil on 9 July 2017. She was the member of the Turkey U23 team that won the gold medal at the 2017 FIVB U23 World Championship in Slovenia, and was selected for the dream team of the championship as the "best middle blocker".

Awards

Individuals
 2017 FIVB U23 World Championship "Best Middle Blocker"
 2017–18 Turkish League Final Series "Best Blocker"

Clubs
 2015–16 CEV Challenge Cup -  Runner-Up, with Trabzon İdmanocağı
 2017–18 Turkish Cup -  Runner-Up, with Eczacıbaşı VitrA
 2017–18 CEV Cup -  Champion, with Eczacıbaşı VitrA
 2017–18 Turkish League -  Runner-Up, with Eczacıbaşı VitrA
 2018 Turkish Super Cup -  Champion, with Eczacıbaşı VitrA
 2018 FIVB Club World Championship -  Bronze Medal, with Eczacıbaşı VitrA
 2018–19 Turkish Cup -  Champion, with Eczacıbaşı VitrA
 2018–19 Turkish League -  Runner-Up, with Eczacıbaşı VitrA
 2019 Turkish Super Cup -  Champion, with Eczacıbaşı VitrA
 2020 Turkish Super Cup -  Champion, with Eczacıbaşı VitrA

National team
 2017 FIVB U23 World Championship -  Gold Medal
 2018 FIVB Nations League -  Silver Medal
 2018 Montreux Volley Masters -  Bronze Medal

References

External links
 Eczacıbaşı VitrA profile 
 FIVB profile
 CEV profile

1995 births
Living people
Sportspeople from İzmir
Turkish women's volleyball players
Eczacıbaşı volleyball players
VakıfBank S.K. volleyballers
Turkey women's international volleyball players